David Ball (born July 9, 1953) is an American country music singer-songwriter and musician. Active since 1988, he has recorded a total of seven studio albums on several labels, including his platinum certified debut Thinkin' Problem. Fourteen of Ball's singles have entered the Billboard Hot Country Songs charts. His highest-peaking chart entries are 1994's "Thinkin' Problem" and 2001's "Riding With Private Malone", both of which peaked at No. 2.

Biography
David Ball was born into a large musical family headed by his father, William "Billy" Ball, a Baptist minister, and his mother, Bessie Ball, a pianist. Later, he moved with his family to Spartanburg, South Carolina where his father was pastor of Fernwood Baptist church. He eventually learned to play guitar after persuading his parents to buy him one. Having written his first song in seventh grade, he played it in a school talent show with a band he had formed, the Strangers. Afterwards, he played upright bass in various local youth groups and also the school orchestra. Together with friends, he took part in various bluegrass and country festivals in the Carolinas.

By the time Ball had left high school, he had a gig playing bass in Uncle Walt's Band, a trio headed by Walter Hyatt, who relocated to Austin, Texas, in the mid-1970s, in an attempt to make a mainstream breakthrough.

Ball subsequently focused on a solo career, moving to Nashville, Tennessee, where he was signed to a publishing contract. Three singles for RCA Nashville in the late 1980s failed to provide a solo breakthrough, however, and a projected album was shelved and was not released until 1994. The experience did at least serve to introduce him to producer Blake Chancey, son of country producer Ron Chancey. In the spring of 1993, Chancey called Warner Bros. Records director Doug Grau on Ball's behalf.

A new recording contract followed. Thinkin' Problem, his debut album, was released on Warner Bros. Its title track served as the lead-off single, reaching No. 2 on the Billboard country music charts and No. 40 on the Billboard Hot 100. The album, which received a platinum certification in the U.S., also produced the singles "When the Thought of You Catches Up with Me", "Look What Followed Me Home", "What Do You Want with His Love", and "Honky Tonk Healin'", although the latter two singles failed to make Top 40 on the country charts.

Ball recorded two more albums for the label – Starlite Lounge and Play – without much chart success. However, "Riding with Private Malone", from the 2001 album Amigo on the Dualtone label, reached a peak of No. 2 on the Billboard Hot Country Singles & Tracks charts (now Hot Country Songs) chart, and No. 36 on the Billboard Hot 100. This album failed to produce any other hits, however, and Ball exited Dualtone in 2002. Freewheeler followed in 2004, Heartaches by the Number in 2007 and Sparkle City in 2010.

In the 1995 album "Come Together: America Salutes The Beatles" David Ball's version of "I'll Follow The Sun" starts off the collection of Beatles songs by other artists.

Ball's "Thinkin' Problem" was parodied by Cledus T. Judd. Ball then appears in Judd's Shania Twain parody "If Shania Was Mine", standing behind the cameras and saying, "At least he's not picking on me this time."

Discography

Studio albums

Compilation albums

Singles

Music videos

Awards & Nominations

Nominations
Country Music Association
 1995 Horizon Award
 1995 Song of the Year - "Thinkin' Problem" written by David Ball, Stuart Ziff and Allen Shamblin

Academy of Country Music
 1994 Top New Male Vocalist

Grammy Awards
 1994 Best Male Country Vocal Performance - "Thinkin' Problem"

References

External links
David Ball's official website
Uncle Walt's Band Showcase on Local Music Scene SC
David Ball Showcase on Local Music Scene SC

1953 births
Living people
People from Rock Hill, South Carolina
American country singer-songwriters
Country musicians from South Carolina
Dualtone Records artists
Warner Records artists
American male singer-songwriters
Uncle Walt's Band members
Singer-songwriters from South Carolina
Lyle Lovett and His Large Band members